The  Sri Lankan Ambassador to Myanmar is the Sri Lankan envoy to Myanmar.

List of Minister and Envoy Extraordinary
 Sir Susantha de Fonseka (1949-1952)
 Sir Velupillai Coomaraswamy (1952-1954)
 A. E. Gunasinha (1954-1956) 
 Raja Hewavitarne (1956-1960)

List of Ambassadors
 Arthur Basnayake
 H. R. Piyasiri
 Nandimithra Ekanayake

See also
List of heads of missions from Sri Lanka

References

External links

Sri Lanka
Myanmar